William Dodds (23 April 1882 – 4 September 1934) was an Australian rules footballer who played with Carlton in the Victorian Football League (VFL).

References

External links 		
		
Bill Dodds's profile at Blueseum

1882 births
Australian rules footballers from Victoria (Australia)
Carlton Football Club players
1934 deaths